François Dalle (18 March 1918 – 9 August 2005) was a French entrepreneur who served as CEO of French multinational cosmetics company L'Oréal between 1957 and 1984.

Personal life
Born on 18 March 1918 in the small town of the Pas-de-Calais region in the north of France, François Leon Marie-Joseph Dalle was the son of a brewer. Dalle attended the University of Paris to study law. Upon graduating he practiced for two years then took a job with French Soap brand Monsavon. As he moved up in the company he later became director of a factory where he met the founder of L'Oreal Eugène Schueller. He married in 1982 Genevieve Clement but later divorced. Out of their marriage, the couple had four sons and two daughters.
After his death in 2005, Sir Lindsay Owen-Jones succeeded him as L'oreal CEO.

Career 
In 1948, François Dalle joined the small twenty-five-person team at L'Oreal to improve the marketing strategies of the brand. Before his arrival, the brand almost exclusively sold its products in hair salons and pharmacies. Dalle made an innovative decision decided to start selling products in retail stores to reach a new market. This had never been done before and set up L'Oreal to be one of the top innovative makeup companies in the world. He became the company's CEO after the death of its founder, Eugène Schueller, in 1957. From 1957–1984 he oversaw one of the most exciting periods of the company's history in expanding and internationalizing the range of brands and managing aggressive international expansion. His most notable expansion was to the United States and Japan. During his time with the company L'Oreal acquired prestigious makeup brands such as Lancome, Garnier, Biotherm, and Vichy.

Many French politicians from both sides came to Mr. Dalle for counseling on economic, industrial, and employment issues. 
He also served as a board member of the Swiss-based food company Nestlé and TV companies TF1 and Canal+. His time spent on the board cultivated great relationships with each of these companies. To this day Nestlé still has 26.4 percent interest in L'Oreal.

A keen supporter of management education, he served on the board of INSEAD, was president of CELSA, and a co-founder of CEDEP (the European Centre for Executive Development).
In 2001, François Dalle wrote a book title "L'Aventure l'Oréal" the book covered the "spirit of L'Oreal as Dalle called it and explained how he and his staff created the icon that is the brand L'Oreal today.

Resources

20th-century French businesspeople
2005 deaths
L'Oréal people
1918 births